Trade unions in Antigua and Barbuda have a significant presence in the workforce, representing approximately 75% of Antigua and Barbuda workers.

Trade unions operate freely, and the labour code recognizes the right to collective bargaining and strike action. However, many industries are classified as "essential services", and may be restricted from striking or subject to enforced mediation.

References